The 2014–15 HNK Rijeka season was the 69th season in its history. It was their 24th successive season in the Prva HNL, and 41st successive top tier season.

Competitions

Overall

Last updated: 29 May 2015.

Prva HNL

Classification

Results summary

Results by round

Results by opponent

Source: 2014–15 Croatian First Football League article

UEFA Europa League

Group stage

Matches

Prva HNL

Source: HRnogomet.com

Croatian Cup

Source: HRnogomet.com.

UEFA Europa League

Source: uefa.com

Croatian Supercup

Sources: HRnogomet.com

Friendlies

Pre-season

On-season

Mid-season

Player seasonal records
Competitive matches only. Updated to games played 29 May 2015.

Goals

Source: Competitive matches

Assists

Source: Competitive matches

Clean sheets

Source: Competitive matches

Disciplinary record

Source: nk-rijeka.hr

Appearances and goals

Penalties

Overview of statistics

Transfers

In

Source: Glasilo Hrvatskog nogometnog saveza

Out

Source: Glasilo Hrvatskog nogometnog saveza

Spending:  €1,550,000
Income:  €14,100,000
Expenditure:  €12,550,000

Notes

References

2014-15
Croatian football clubs 2014–15 season
2014–15 UEFA Europa League participants seasons